This is a list of figures and some organizations sponsored by German sports apparel company Puma.

Olympic committees

 Cuba (at Rio 2016)
 Jamaica

American football

 Julian Edelman
 Jamaal Charles
 Cordarrelle Patterson
 Jadeveon Clowney

Association football

National teams

Africa

America

 
  (Until 2022-23 season)

Asia

Oceania

Europe

Clubs

Africa

  Police XI
  Pyramids
  Al-Ahly SC (Benghazi)
  Accra Lions
  Mathare United
  Muslim Scouts
  Jomo Cosmos
  Mamelodi Sundowns
  Green Eagles
  Indeni
  Kabwe Warriors
  Kipanga

Asia

  Melbourne City FC
  Sichuan Jiuniu F.C.
  Bengaluru FC
  Mumbai City FC
  Cerezo Osaka
  Kawasaki Frontale
  Shimizu S-Pulse
  Oita Trinita
  Roasso Kumamoto
  Kyoto Sanga FC
  Yokohama FC
  Petaling Jaya City FC
  Penang
  Kuala Lumpur Rovers
  Hilal Al-Quds
  Al-Arabi
  Al-Duhail SC
  Al-Wakrah SC
  Al-Ain
  Lion City Sailors FC
  Suwon Samsung Bluewings
  Jeonnam Dragons
  Pohang Steelers
  Busan Ipark
  Altyn Asyr FK
  Navbahor
  Al Jazira FC

Europe

  Skënderbeu Korçë
  Ararat-Armenia
  Van  
  Mattersburg
  Rapid Wien
  Kyzyltash Bakhchisaray
  AEK Larnaca
  Apollon Limassol
  Slovácko
  Slavia Prague 
  Teplice
  Hobro
  Randers
  Altrincham
  Barnsley
  Barrow 
  Brackley Town 
  Blackpool
  Leyton Orient 
  Manchester City 
  Peterborough United 
  Plymouth Argyle
  Rotherham United
  Stockport County 
  Swindon Town
  Torquay United
  West Bromwich Albion
  Wigan Athletic
  York City
  FC Honka
  HIFK
  IFK Mariehamn 
  KuPS
  RoPS
  TPS
  VPS
  Amiens
  Boulogne
  Lens
  Marseille
  Martigues
  Pau
  Rennes
  Sedan
 Torpedo Kutaisi (Until 2022–23 season)
  Altona
  Borussia Dortmund
  Borussia Mönchengladbach
  SV Drochtersen/Assel
  Greuther Fürth
  Steinbach Haiger
  Hallescher FC
  Heidenheim
  Ingolstadt
  Carl Zeiss Jena
  Holstein Kiel
  Viktoria Köln
  RB Leipzig  (From 2023/2024 season)
  Lippstadt
  Sportfreunde Lotte
  Wacker Nordhausen
  Schwarz-Weiß Rehden
  1860 Rosenheim
  Astoria Walldorf
  Zwickau
  OFI
  Kazincbarcika
  Újpest
  Mestre
  Milan
  Parma (From 2023/2024 season)
  Sassuolo
  Atlantas
  Ħamrun Spartans F.C.
  PSV Eindhoven
  Cliftonville
  Lillestrøm SK
  Strømsgodset
  HamKam
  Cracovia Kraków
  Rio Ave F.C.
  CS Marítimo
  CF Canelas 2010
  Universitatea Craiova
  Krasnodar
  Krylia Sovetov Samara
  FC Dynamo Moscow 
  Inverness Caledonian Thistle
  Raith Rovers
  Falkirk
  Alavés  
  Girona 
  Sporting Gijón 
  Valencia
  Häcken
  Helsingborg
  Malmö 
  Mjällby AIF
  Vaduz
  Fenerbahçe
  Kasımpaşa 
  Shakhtar Donetsk

America

  Parham
  Independiente
  Palmeiras
  Bolívar
  Puerto Golfito F. C.
  L.D.U. Quito
  Guadalajara
  Monterrey
  Honduras Progreso
  San Francisco
  Costa del Este
  Cerro Porteño
  Club Libertad
  Peñarol 
  Montevideo City Torque
  Defensor Sporting
  Appalachian FC
  Fort Worth Vaqueros
  Indy Eleven
  Memphis 901 FC
  Monterey Bay FC
  New Mexico United
  Rio Grande Valley FC
  San Antonio FC
  FC Tucson
  Northern Colorado Hailstorm
  Saint Charles FC

Oceania
 
  Petone

Associations
Puma is the official ball supplier for the following leagues and associations:

  First Professional Football League
   English Football League 
 EFL Championship
 EFL League One
 EFL League Two
 EFL Cup
 EFL Trophy
  Israel Football Association
 Israeli Premier League
 Israel Super Cup
 Israeli State Cup
 Toto Cup
  Lega Serie A (From 2022–23 season)
 Serie A 
 Supercoppa Italiana 
 Coppa Italia 
 Campionato Primavera
 Supercoppa Primavera
 Coppa Italia Primavera 
  Torneo di Viareggio
  Tusker Premier League
  Malaysian Football League
 Malaysia Super League
 Piala Sumbangsih
 Malaysian FA Cup
 Malaysia Premier League
 Malaysia Cup
  Liga de Fútbol Profesional (LaLiga)
 LaLiga Santander
 LaLiga SmartBank
  Turkish Football Federation 
 Süper Lig
 Turkish Super Cup
 Turkish Cup
 TFF First League
 TFF Second League
 TFF Third League
  Uruguayan Primera División 
  Uzbekistan Super League

Referees
Puma is also the official referee kits supplier for the leagues:

  Crimean Premier League
  Royal Moroccan Football Federation
 Botola
 Moroccan Super Cup
 Moroccan Throne Cup
 Botola 2

Players

Algeria
  Karim Ziani
  Rafik Halliche
  Hassan Yebda
Angola
  Manucho
  Mateus
  Djalma
Argentina
  Facundo Affranchino
  Oscar Ahumada
  Darío Benedetto
  Germán Cano
  Juan Pablo Carrizo
  Fabián Cubero
  Cristian Fabbiani
  Federico Fernández
  Jonás Gutiérrez
  Rubens Sambueza
  Pablo Mouche
  Matías Dituro
  Cristian Villagra
  Facundo Roncaglia
  Pablo Piatti
  Nicolás Sánchez
  Mariano Andújar
  Christian Gómez
  Fabián Rinaudo
  Sebastián Leto
Austria
  Marko Arnautović
  Sebastian Prödl
  Michael Gspurning
  Paul Scharner
  Manuela Zinsberger
Belgium
  Axel Witsel
  Ibrahim Kargbo Jr.
Belarus
  Alexander Hleb
Bosnia and Herzegovina
  Vedad Ibišević
Brazil
  Neymar
  Marta
  Dante
  Alan
  Antônio Carlos
  Denílson
  Diogo
  Dudu Cearense
  Ederson
  Fábio Costa
  Maurine
  Cristiane
  Rosana
  Antony
  Fernando Menegazzo
  Gilberto Silva
  Thiago Silva
  Guilherme
  Jadson
  Lucas Severino
  Lucas Veríssimo
  Érika
  Aline Pellegrino
  Moisés
  Neílton
  Rafael
  Rivaldo
  Thomas
  Victor Golas
  Xandão
Bulgaria
  Velizar Dimitrov
  Dimitar Rangelov
Burkina Faso
  Ibrahim Gnanou
  Paul Kéba Koulibaly
Cameroon
  Alex Song
  Eric Djemba-Djemba
  Carlos Kameni
  Mohammadou Idrissou
  Landry N'Guémo
  Gaëtan Bong
Canada
  Dwayne De Rosario
Chile
  Cristopher Toselli
  Matias Fernández
  Oscar Opazo
  Marcelo Diaz
  Mauricio Pinilla
  Edson Puch
  Cristóbal Jorquera
  Sebastián Ubilla
  Franco Lobos
Democratic Republic of the Congo 
  Trésor Mputu
Colombia
  Giovanni Hernández
  Sergio Otalvaro
Ivory Coast
  Yaya Touré
  Seydou Doumbia
  Emmanuel Eboué
  Kader Keïta
  Abdoulaye Méïté
  Aruna Dindane
Croatia
  Dejan Lovren
Denmark
  Peter Løvenkrands
  Kasper Bøgelund
  Jakob Poulsen
  Patrick Mtiliga
Ecuador
  Christian Noboa
  Fidel Martínez
  Librado Azcona
Egypt
  Essam El-Hadary
  Mohamed Zidan
  Ahmed Fathi
  Sayed Moawad
  Mohamed Shawky
  Mohamed Aboutrika
England
  James Maddison
  Jordan Pickford
  Harry Maguire
  Todd Cantwell
  Adam Lallana
  Isaac Hayden
  Joel Latibeaudiere
  Kyle Walker
France
  Kingsley Coman
  Olivier Giroud
  Antoine Griezmann
  Raphaël Varane
  Lucas Digne
  Allan Saint-Maximin
  Gaël Clichy
  Marama Vahirua
  Mathieu Flamini
  Florent Sinama Pongolle
  Samuel Umtiti
  Dimitri Payet 
  Steve Mandanda
Germany
  Marco Reus
  Julian Weigl
  Mahmoud Dahoud
  Bernd Leno
  Kevin Großkreutz
  Christian Tiffert
  Tobias Sippel
  David Odonkor
  Oliver Kirch
  Georg Niedermeier
  Marcell Jansen
  Markus Pröll
  Martina Müller
  Kim Kulig
  Roberto Hilbert
  Selim Teber
  Alexander Meier
  Roman Weidenfeller
  Patrick Owomoyela
Ghana
  Asamoah Gyan
  John Mensah
  Emmanuel Frimpong
  Hans Sarpei
  Lee Addy
  Matthew Amoah
  Kwadwo Asamoah
Greece
  Giorgos Karagounis
  Vasilis Torosidis
Honduras
  Julio César de León
  Amado Guevara
Hong Kong
  Lee Chi Ho
  Jaimes McKee
India
  Nishu Kumar
  Sahal Abdul Samad
  Rahul Bheke
  Rehenesh TP
  Sunil Chhetri
  Gurpreet Singh Sandhu
  Vinit Rai
  Dheeraj Singh Moirangthem
  Mohammad Nawaz
 Mohammad Rakip
  Hormipam Ruivah
Ireland
  Stephen Hunt
  Caleb Folan
  Katie McCabe
Italy
  Mario Balotelli
  Roberto Baronio
  Alessandro Bastoni
  Gianluigi Buffon
  Giorgio Chiellini
  Massimo Coda
  Alessandro Diamanti
  Gaetano D'Agostino
  Simone Edera
  Sara Gama
  Jorginho
  Michele Paolucci
  Sebastiano Siviglia
  Guglielmo Stendardo
Japan
  Koya Kitagawa
  Kazuyoshi Miura
  Makoto Hasebe
  Masato Yamazaki
  Ryūji Bando
  Daiya Maekawa
  Daisuke Matsui
  Yūichi Komano
  Yuji Nakazawa
  Eiji Kawashima
  Yu Kobayashi
  Shogo Taniguchi
  Ritsu Doan
  Kaoru Mitoma
  Yasuto Wakizaka
  Kento Tachibanada
South Korea
  Yeom Ki-Hun
  Kim Min-Woo
Libano
  Abbas Hassan
  Hussein Hamdan
  Khaled Hamieh
  Hassan Moghnieh
North Macedonia
  Gligor Gligorov
Mali
  Seydou Keita
Mexico
  Adrián Aldrete
  Diana Evangelista
  José de Jesús Corona
  Hugo González Durán
  Hiram Mier
  Jesús Molina
  Rogelio Funes Mori
  Alan Pulido
  Daniela Solís
Netherlands
  Memphis Depay
  Ibrahim Afellay
  Tim de Cler
  Gregory van der Wiel
Nigeria
  John Utaka
  Chidi Odiah
  Chinedu Obasi
Norway
  Daniel Braaten
  Ingrid Engen
Paraguay
  Pedro Sarabia
  Édgar González
  Enrique Vera
  Miguel Almirón
  Lucas Barrios
  Roque Santa Cruz 
  Julio Enciso
  Ivan Torres
Phlippines
  Amin Nazari
  Simone Rota
  Daisuke Sato
Poland
  Jakub Rzeźniczak
  Grzegorz Krychowiak 
  Euzebiusz Smolarek
  Artur Wichniarek
  Tomasz Bandrowski
  Sebastian Mila
  Jakub Wawrzyniak
  Maciej Rybus
  Sławomir Peszko 
Portugal
  Luís Boa Morte
  Fernando Meira
  Pedro Mendes
  Daniel Carriço
  Abel
  Eduardo
  João Pereira
  Carlos Saleiro
  Silvestre Varela
  Nuno André Coelho
  Diogo Salomão
Russia
  Marat Izmailov
  Diniyar Bilyaletdinov
Saudi Arabia
  Abdullah Shuhail
Scotland
  Scott Brown
  Kevin Thomson
  Caroline Weir
Slovenia
  Jan Oblak
  Dalibor Volaš
Senegal
  Kalidou Koulibaly
Serbia
  Nemanja Matić
  Milan Jovanović
  Miloš Krasić
  Miralem Sulejmani
Singapore
  Isa Halim
  Juma'at Jantan
  Lionel Lewis
  Yasir Hanapi
  Shi Jiayi
  Joey Sim
  Hyrulnizam Juma'at
South Africa
  Steven Pienaar
Spain
  Marc Bartra
  Diego Capel
  Santi Cazorla
  Cesc Fàbregas
  Josemi
  Joseba Llorente
  Vicky Losada
  Manu
  José Marsà
  Nacho Monreal
  Nolito
  José Manuel Pinto
  Alba Redondo
  David Silva
  Fernando Varela
Sweden
  Fridolina Rolfö
  Behrang Safari
Switzerland
  Yann Sommer
  Lara Dickenmann
  Lia Wälti
Thailand
  Nont Muangngam
Turkey
  Ali Tandoğan
  Bekir Ozan Has
  Mehmet Yılmaz
  Caner Celep
Tunisia
  Hamed Namouchi
Ukraine
  Oleksandr Zinchenko
Uruguay
  Álvaro Pereira
  Diego Godín
  Cristian Rodríguez
  Álvaro González
  Luis Suárez
  Fernando Muslera
United States
  Matt Reis
  Michael Bradley
  Wells Thompson
  Kasey Keller
  Chad Barrett
  Bryan Namoff
  Christian Pulisic
Wales
  Jack Collison
  Carl Robinson
Zambia
  Given Singuluma

Notable former players

  Sergio Agüero
  Diego Maradona
  Martin Palermo
  Mark Schwarzer
  Pelé
  Hristo Stoichkov
  Samuel Eto'o
  Lauren
  Faustino Asprilla
  Ivan Kaviedes
  Paul Gascoigne
  Peter Shilton
  Laurie Cunningham
  Lothar Matthäus
  Rudi Völler
  Nicolas Anelka
  Thierry Henry
  Ludovic Giuly
  Robert Pires
  Didier Deschamps
  Safaa Hadi
  Shay Given
  George Best
  Mauro Camoranesi
  Enrico Chiesa
  Angelo Peruzzi
  Jared Borgetti
  Oribe Peralta
  Johan Cruyff
  Jay-Jay Okocha
  Darío Verón
  Eusébio
  Ahn Jung-hwan
  Nemanja Vidić
  Alexander Frei
  Stephan Lichtsteiner
  Diego Benaglio
  Sebastián Abreu
  Álvaro Recoba
  Enzo Francescoli
  Kenny Dalglish
  Raúl Tamudo

Coaches

  Pep Guardiola

Australian Rules Football

  Carlton Football Club
 Greater Western Sydney Giants
 North Melbourne Football Club
 Richmond Football Club
 NAB League
 The Allies
 U18 All-Australian team

Basketball

 Dennis Schröder
 Deandre Ayton
 RJ Barrett
 Killian Hayes
 LaMelo Ball
 Marvin Bagley
 Sterling Brown
 DeMarcus Cousins
 Skylar Diggins-Smith
 Rudy Gay
 Danny Green
 Derrick Jones Jr.
 Kevin Knox
 Kyle Kuzma
 Mac McClung
 Kendrick Nunn
 Kevin Porter Jr.
 Michael Porter Jr.
 Terry Rozier
 Katie Lou Samuelson
 Marcus Smart
 Zhaire Smith
 Breanna Stewart
 Jackie Young

National teams

Club teams 
 Brose Bamberg
 Medi Bayreuth
 Baskonia
 Maccabi Tel Aviv

College teams 
  FEU Tamaraws

Notable former players
  Vince Carter
  Walt Frazier
  Ralph Sampson
  Isiah Thomas

Boxing
 Cuba national amateur boxing athletes
 Antonio Margarito
 Mary Kom
 Pooja Rani
 Anselmo Moreno
 Miguel Cotto

Cricket

Club teams

 Royal Challengers Bangalore

Players

 Rashid Khan
 James Peirson
 Kurtis Patterson 
 Mitchell Marsh
 Mushfiqur Rahim
 Shakib Al Hasan
 Laurie Evans 
 Sam Billings
 Geraint Jones
 Chris Jordan
 Mal Loye
 Virat Kohli
 Yuvraj Singh
 K. L. Rahul
 Washington Sundar
 Deepak Hooda
 Devdutt Padikkal
 Harleen Deol
 Deepti Sharma
 Richa Ghosh
 KS Bharat
  Brendon McCullum
 Heino Kuhn
 Dean Elgar
 Sarel Erwee
 Abdullah Shafique
 Asif Ali
 Babar Azam
 Imam Ul Haq
 Shadab Khan
 Charith Asalanka
 Niroshan Dickwella

Esports

Competitions
FIA-Certified Gran Turismo Championships
 King Pro League
 Wild Rift League (All teams uniforms)

Teams

 AGO
 All Knights
 ATK
 Entropiq
 eSuba
 FunPlus Phoenix
 Frank Esports
 FUT Esports
 Gen.G
 IHC Esports
 KRÜ Esports
 Manchester City Esports
 MOUZ
 Natus Vincere
 Revenant Esports
 Seoul Dynasty

Fencing
 Elisa Di Francisca

Field Hockey

Players

 Gurjant Singh
 Gurjit Kaur
 Harmanpreet Singh
 Mandeep Singh
 Navneet Kaur
 Rupinder Pal Singh
 Savita Punia
 Sushila Chanu
 Udita Duhan
 Vandana Katariya

Figure skating

 Daisuke Takahashi
 Alina Zagitova
 Kamila Valieva

Gaelic Games (GAA)

 John Mullane
 Sean Cavanagh
 Ciarán Whelan
 Aidan O'Mahony
 Henry Shefflin

Golf

Men

 Rickie Fowler 
 Justin Suh 
 Matti Schmid
 Jonas Blixt
 Graham Delaet
 Johan Edfors 
 Jesper Parnevik 
 Will MacKenzie 
 J. J. Spaun
 Greg Norman
 Søren Kjeldsen
 Bryson DeChambeau
 Álvaro Quirós
 Eddie Pepperell
 Emiliano Grillo
 Gary Woodland

Women

 Lexi Thompson 
 Blair O'Neal 
 Amy Boulden 
 Lee-Anne Pace
 Joanna Klatten 
 Dewi Schreefel

Motorsports

Formula One

 Mercedes-AMG Petronas F1 Team
 Scuderia Ferrari
 Alfa Romeo F1 Team Orlen

DTM (Deutsche Tourenwagen Masters)
 Schubert Motorsport
  Walkenhorst Motorsport
 AlphaTauri AF Corse
 Red Bull AF Corse

NASCAR
 Team Penske

IndyCar
 Team Penske

Formula E
 Andretti Autosport
 Porsche Formula E Team

W series
 Puma W series Team

Rallycross
 Subaru Puma Rallycross Team (2012–2013)

Handball

National teams 

  Denmark
  Germany

Kabaddi

Club teams 

  U Mumba

Netball
 Melbourne Vixens
 New Zealand national netball team
 South Africa national netball team

Rugby league
 Queensland Maroons
 New South Wales Blues
 New Zealand Warriors

Players

 Josh Addo-Carr
 Kurt Capewell
 Jamal Fogarty
 Jake Friend
 Clint Gutherson
 Cameron Munster
 Brian To'o
 Shaun Lane
 Karl Lawton
 Aaron Pene
 Maika Sivo
 Jahrome Hughes
 Moses Leota
 Jeremiah Nanai
 Felise Kaufusi
 Jason Taumalolo

Rugby union

National teams

  Zimbabwe

Club teams

  Bulls
  Blue Bulls

Players

  Agustin Creevy
  Mathew Tait
  Luke Cowan-Dickie
  Tommy Bowe
  Gordon D'Arcy
  Luke Fitzgerald
  Jamie Heaslip
  Hamish Watson
  Shane Williams
  Percy Montgomery
  Schalk Burger
  Victor Matfield
  Duane Vermeulen
  Francois Louw
  Fourie Du Preez
  Adriaan Strauss
  RG Snyman
  Lukhanyo Am
  Bongi Mbonambi
  Trevor Nyakane
  Makazole Mapimpi
  Tyrone Green

Shooting
 Avani Lekhara
 Manu Bhaker

Swimming
 Srihari Nataraj

Table Tennis

Club teams
 RPSG Mavericks Kolkata

Players

 Bhavina Patel

Track and field

National teams

  Australia
 
 
  Cayman Islands
 
  Dominican Republic
 
 
  Jamaica

Athletes

Men

 Rohan Browning
 Ryan Gregson 340,000
 Karsten Warholm
 Allan Mortimer $500,000
 Shavez Hart  $450,000
 Ryan Ingraham. $150,000
 Michael Mathieu
 Teray Smith
 Andrew Fisher
 Andre De Grasse
 Luguelín Santos
 Pierre-Ambroise Bosse
 Jimmy Vicaut
 Richard Buck
 Mark Lewis-Francis
 Panagiotis Trivizas
 Ierotheos Dritsas
 Tejinder Singh
 Nathon Allen
 Marvin Anderson
 Oshane Bailey
 Akeem Bloomfield
 Usain Bolt
 Lerone Clarke
 Javon Francis
 Nigel Ellis
 Jermaine Gonzales
 Jaheel Hyde
 Michael Morrison
 Dwight Mullings
 Michael O'hara
 Andrew Riley
 Maurice Smith
 Edino Steele
 Hansle Parchment
 Asafa Powell
 Timothy Beck
 Mohamed Moustaoui
 EJ Obiena
 Henricho Bruintjies
 Armand Duplantis
 Johan Wissman
 Moses Kipsiro
 KC Lightfoot
 Joshua Norman
 Byron Banks
 Will Claye
 Terrence Jones
 Enos Henry
 Sean Quigley
 Woo Sang-hyeok
 Marcell Jacobs

Women

 Christine Amertil
 Ekta Bhyan
 Andrea Bliss
 Jamie Carrero
 Dutee Chand
 Eilidh Child
 Liz Clay
 Delilah DiCrescenzo
 Vonette Dixon
 Sheniqua Ferguson
 Genevieve Gregson
 Floria Gueï
 Linden Hall
 Chelsea Hammond
 Michelle Jenneke
 Jenny Kallur
 Alesha Kelly
 Nicola McDermott
 Sabrina Mockenhaupt
 Natasha Morrison
 Ezinne Okparaebo
 Mosxoula Manoussou Paraskevopoulos
 Susan Partridge
 Jenna Prandini
 Anneliese Rubie
 Molly Seidel
 Kelly Sharpton
 Yarisley Silva
 Nivea Smith
 Indira Spence
 Kaliese Spencer
 Abby Steiner
 Anthonique Strachan
 Shevon Stoddart
 Bianca Stuart
 Ristananna Tracey
 Stavroula Xrisaidi
 Shericka Jackson
 Elaine Thompson
 Devynne Charlton

Waterpolo
 Valletta WPC

Volleyball

National team
 Men / Women
 Women

Collaborations

  Jadeveon Clowney
  Jamaal Charles
  Alexander McQueen (+)
  Hussein Chalayan
  UNDFTD
  Julian Edelman
  Winnie Harlow

Artists

 Melina Lezcano
 Rihanna
 Deadmau5
 The Weeknd
 Luhan
 Yang Yang
 Josh Kans
 Mark B
 Professor Green
 Dua Lipa
 Krept and Konan
 Kimberley Walsh
 DJ Fresh
 Cara Delevingne
 Frankmusik
 Steve Appleton
 Steve Rushton
 Alonzo
 Booba
 Arif Chaudhary
 Disha Patani
 Divine
 Sara Ali Khan
 Zaeden
 Krystal Jung
 Ahn Jae-hyun
 BTS
 Sunmi
 Bibi (singer)
 Aiki
 NCT 127
 Bunkface
 Nadhira
 Amirul Farhan
 Faliq Auri
 Efry Arwis
 Tam Cobain
 Aznie Azmi
 Ayunie Rizal
 Faa Zaini
 Iqram Dinzly
 Aedy Ashraf
 Firdaus Ghufran
 Muntazar Ghufran
 Fariz Isqandar
 Aniq Iffat
 Idan Aedan
 Zizan Razak
 Shaheizy Sam
 Tiz Zaqyah
 Izz Ilham
 Nia Atasha
 Mierul Aiman
 Nadhir Nasar
 Kamal Adli
 Aczino
 Davido
 Tom Taus
 Paolo Nutini
 Aaron Aziz
 Die Antwoord
 Nasty C
 Nomzamo Mbatha
 Korn
 Jay-Z
 Big Sean
 Kylie Jenner
 Eve
 Keri Hilson
 Dia Frampton
 Meek Mill
 Rae Sremmurd
 Vic Mensa
 Casey Veggies
 Dyme-A-Duzin
 Anna Maria Perez de Tagle
 Ellington Ratliff
 Selena Gomez
 Honor Society
 Jesse McCartney
 Smokepurpp
 Paul Stanley
 A Boogie Wit Da Hoodie
 Nipsey Hussle
 G Herbo
 Yo Gotti 
 G-Eazy
 J.Cole

See also
 Puma AG
 List of Adidas sponsorships
 List of ASICS sponsorships
 List of Nike sponsorships
 List of Under Armour sponsorships

References

Puma (brand)
Sports sponsorships